Larkspur is a home rule municipality in Douglas County, Colorado, United States. The town population was 183 at the 2010 census, down from 234 at the 2000 census. Each year, on weekends in June, July and August, the Colorado Renaissance Festival is held in the hills just west of the town. The town is served by Larkspur Elementary School, a K-6 school in the Douglas County school district.

A post office called Larkspur has been in operation since 1871. The community was named for the abundance of larkspur near the original town site.

Larkspur is also the site of the historic headquarters building of Universal Co-Masonry According to the town's website, Larkspur's Vision Statement is "Larkspur, a small friendly town in Colorado. A town that works together by: Fostering a Government of Integrity that Responds to its People, Directing Future Growth within Larkspur´s Small Town Values, Providing Community Facilities and Activities for All Ages, and Preserving the Natural Environment that is Unique to the Larkspur Area."

Geography
Interstate 25 passes along the eastern edge of the town, with access from Exits 172, 173, and 174.

Demographics

As of the census of 2000, there were 234 people, 92 households, and 59 families residing in the town. The racial makeup of the town was 97.86% White, 0.85% Native American, and 1.28% from two or more races. Hispanic or Latino of any race were 1.71% of the population.

There were 92 households, out of which 34.8% had children under the age of 18 living with them, 55.4% were married couples living together, 9.8% had a female householder with no husband present, and 34.8% were non-families. 28.3% of all households were made up of individuals, and 4.3% had someone living alone who was 65 years of age or older. The average household size was 2.54 and the average family size was 3.18.

In the town, the population was spread out, with 27.4% under the age of 18, 5.1% from 18 to 24, 30.3% from 25 to 44, 29.5% from 45 to 64, and 7.7% who were 65 years of age or older. The median age was 40 years. For every 100 females, there were 98.3 males. For every 100 females age 18 and over, there were 93.2 males.

The median income for a household in the town was $43,750, and the median income for a family was $55,625. Males had a median income of $36,528 versus $29,583 for females. The per capita income for the town was $18,150. About 6.4% of families and 8.4% of the population were below the poverty line, including 10.8% of those under the age of eighteen and 17.6% of those 65 or over.

Transportation
The City is Served by I-25.  It was once served by SH-18(Now Upper Lake Gulch Road).  In addition to the highways, Colorado's Joint Line (which is served by Union Pacific and BNSF) also runs through the town with a large Santa Fe bridge at the south end of town.

See also

Outline of Colorado
Index of Colorado-related articles
State of Colorado
Colorado cities and towns
Colorado municipalities
Colorado counties
Douglas County, Colorado
List of statistical areas in Colorado
Front Range Urban Corridor
North Central Colorado Urban Area
Denver-Aurora-Boulder, CO Combined Statistical Area
Denver-Aurora-Broomfield, CO Metropolitan Statistical Area

References

External links
Town of Larkspur official website
CDOT map of the Town of Larkspur

Towns in Douglas County, Colorado
Towns in Colorado
Populated places established in 1980
Denver metropolitan area